Juliwe Cemetery is the last resting place for the population of Juliwe in Johannesburg, South Africa. The cemetery played a great role in cultural, community and religious life and ritual activity; both Christian and African ancestral rites were carried out there.

The cemetery was located on the west side of the nearby cattle kraal. As of 1959, the cemetery contained 2,000 adult graves in which 3000 bodies had been buried, along with 2,635 infant graves. Different ethnic groups would unite in solidarity with Xhosa people catering for Tswana tastes and vice versa.

History
In negotiations over the removal of the residents of Juliwe to the new township of Dobsonville, Soweto, in the late 1950s and 1960s, the cemetery became a contentious issue. With the rest of Juliwe having been erased and covered over by the development of a white-only township, only the cemetery remains as a stark reminder of the community that it supported.

Location
The cemetery is located in the present day Horizon View shopping center, and it is now surrounded on all sides by a suburban homes and covers a full city block bounded by Albert street and van Stanten drive.

References

Further reading

 The Heritage Portal – Roodepoort-Maraisburg History

Cemeteries in South Africa
Johannesburg